My Best to You is a compilation album by American singer Donny Osmond. It contains his hit songs from his first four albums: The Donny Osmond Album, To You with Love, Donny, Portrait of Donny, and Too Young. The album reached number 29 on the Billboard Top LPs chart on February 3, 1973.  It was certified Gold by the RIAA on September 14, 1973.

Track listing

Certifications

References

1972 compilation albums
Donny Osmond albums